The 4th Secretariat of the Communist Party of Vietnam (CPV), formally the 4th Secretariat of the Central Committee of the Communist Party of Vietnam (Vietnamese: Ban Bí thư Ban Chấp hành Trung ương Đảng Cộng sản Việt Nam Khoá IV), was elected by the 1st Plenary Session of the 4th Central Committee (CC) in the immediate aftermath of the 4th National Congress.

Members

References

Bibliography
 

4th Secretariat of the Communist Party of Vietnam